Ascárate is a surname. Notable people with the surname include:

Gabriel Ascárate (born 1987), Argentine rugby union footballer
Ignacio Baleztena Ascárate (1887–1972), Spanish folk customs expert, politician and soldier
Joaquín Baleztena Ascárate (1883–1978), Spanish politician

See also
El Paso, Texas